The Plucky Squire is an action-adventure video game developed by indie developer All Possible Futures and published by Devolver Digital. The game is tentatively planned to release in 2023 for PlayStation 5, Xbox Series X/S, Nintendo Switch, and Steam. The game follows the magical adventures of storybook characters Jot and his friends who discover a three-dimensional world outside the pages of their book.

Premise 
The Plucky Squire is centered around the heroic Jot who is kicked out of his story book by the villainous Humgrump, forcing Jot to explore and face challenges both within his story book and the outside world. When the malevolent Humgrump realizes that he is the villain of the story who is destined to be defeated by the forces of righteousness led by the heroic Jot, he kicks the hero out of its pages and changes the story forever. 

In order to restore the storybook's happy ending and save his friends from Humgrump's dark forces, Jot must face various challenges unlike anything he's ever seen. On his journey to restore the book's ending Jot finds himself with the ability to jump between the 2D and 3D worlds encountering puzzles he must solve and mini challenges to complete such as boxing badgers, jetpack flying, and many more obstacles as he becomes the hero of a living storybook.

Development 
The Plucky Squire is being developed by indie game studio All Possible Futures which was founded by James Turner and Jonathan Biddle. Before co-founding All Possible Futures, Turner was a designer for Pokémon and directed the art for the game Pokémon Sword & Shield. Co-founder Biddle has previously worked with Devolver Digital as the creative director for The Swords of Ditto and founded the studio Onebitbeyond who also developed the game.

References

External Links 
 Official Website

Upcoming video games scheduled for 2023
Action-adventure games
PlayStation 5 games
Xbox Series X and Series S games
Nintendo Switch games
Windows games
Devolver Digital games
Platform games